Milap is a 1955 Indian Hindi-language comedy drama film directed by Raj Khosla. The film featured Dev Anand and Geeta Bali in the lead roles.

Plot 

Rajendra Sayal becomes a millionaire from a poverty-stricken situation with the help of his friend Kalu. Jealous of his sudden elevation in status, a lawyer named Karamchand plots to rob Sayal of all his property. For this reason, he hires Asha to seduce Sayal and make him fall in love with her, but she ends up falling for him. He too reciprocates her feelings, and discovers Karamchand's nefarious schemes. The film ends in a courtroom, where Karamchand stands exposed for his misdeeds. Sayal and Asha happily unite.

Cast 

 Dev Anand as Rajendra Sayal
 Geeta Bali as Asha
 Johnny Walker as Kalu
 K. N. Singh as Lawyer Karamchand
 Krishan Dhawan (credited as "Krishin Dhawan") as Mohan Dayal
 Kumkum as courtesan
 Rajendra as Teju
 Tun Tun as Mrs. Akhrodwala
 Indira (actress) as Miss Rosy Akhrodwala
 Kesar bai as Rai Bahadur's step-sister
 Lily Kelkar as Rai bahadur's niece
 Rajan Kapoor as defence attorney
 T.N Charlie as Tailor of Tip Top
 Rirkoo as Insurance agent

Soundtrack 

The music was composed by Datta Naik, while Sahir Ludhianvi wrote the lyrics for the songs. On the album, film critic Vijay Lokapally of The Hindu called Geeta Dutt's rendition of the song "Jaate Ho To Jaao Par Jaaoge Kahaan" as "hummable" while terming the rest as "forgettable".

Reception 
Lokapally noted that Anand's "transformation from a naïve character to a sophisticated urban is expectedly breezy." He felt the film "was not the best offering from Raj Khosla".

References

External links 
 
 Milap at Bollywood Hungama
 Milap Full Film on YouTube

1955 films
1950s Hindi-language films
Indian black-and-white films
1955 musical films
Indian musical comedy-drama films
1950s musical comedy-drama films